Akhlidin Shukurovich Israilov (tr. Akhlidin Shukurovich Israilov; born 16 September 1994) is a Kyrgyz professional footballer who plays as attacking midfielder for Neftchi Kochkor-Ata in the Kyrgyz Premier League.

Career
In his first year for his club, Israilov scored 4 goals from 15 matches. His goals included a brace against Odesa. He also played 2 cup matches against Shakhtar Sverdlovsk.

Israilov made his international debut on 15 October 2013 against Tajikistan. He scored a goal as well as received a yellow card, as Kyrgyzstan defeated Tajikistan 1–4.

International statistics
Scores and results list Kyrgyzstan's goal tally first.

References

External links
 
 
 Akhlidin Israilov at Footballdatabase
 

1994 births
Living people
Association football midfielders
Kyrgyzstani footballers
Kyrgyzstan international footballers
FC Dynamo-2 Kyiv players
Kyrgyzstani expatriate footballers
People from Osh Region
Expatriate footballers in Ukraine
Kyrgyzstani expatriate sportspeople in Ukraine
FC Cherkashchyna players
Ukrainian First League players
NEROCA FC players
PSIS Semarang players
FK Andijon players
2019 AFC Asian Cup players
Kyrgyzstani expatriate sportspeople in India
Kyrgyzstani expatriate sportspeople in Indonesia
Expatriate footballers in India